Carlos Garrido may refer to:

Carlos Sampaio Garrido (1883–1960), Portuguese diplomat
Carlos Hugo Garrido Chalén (born 1951), Peruvian poet
Carlos Garrido (footballer, born 1977), Chilean football defender
Carlos Garrido (footballer, born 1994), Spanish football defender

See also
Juan Carlos Garrido (born 1969), Spanish football manager